The London International Basketball Invitational was a men's basketball competition. It took place at the Basketball Arena in London and was the first event to take place in the Olympic Park. The event was part of the London Prepares series and was organised by the London Organising Committee of the Olympic Games and Paralympic Games.

The event took place between 16 and 21 August 2011 and was held in a round robin format. The tournament tested the venue's scoreboards, the playing area accreditation and catering. The competition featured six international teams: Australia, China, Croatia, France, Great Britain and Serbia. After five rounds, France were the winners after going through the competition undefeated.

Tournament
The tournament was the first sporting competition to take place in the Olympic Park. The tournament took the shape of a round robin format meaning that each team played each other. The event was contested between six national men's basketball teams. The teams which competed were Australia, China, Croatia, France, hosts Great Britain and Serbia. The test event took place in the Basketball Arena. The arena is a temporary structure constructed in 2010 and 2011, situated on the north of the Olympic park. It can hold up to 12,000 people during the games and cost an estimate of £40,000,000. For the test event the venue had a capacity of 3,000. Serbia were the highest ranked team in the tournament, ranked at number 8 in the world. The tournament featured 4 other top 20 teams with Great Britain the lowest ranked at 53 in the world.

The event was part of the London Prepares series and tested the competition floors, scoreboards, accreditation and catering. The competition was run and organised by the London Organising Committee of the Olympic Games and Paralympic Games (LOCOG).

Teams and squads

|}
| valign="top" |
 Head coach
 
 Assistant coach(es)
 
 
 Technical assistant
 
 Strength & conditioning coach
 
 

Legend
 (C) Team captain
 Club field describes current pro club
 Age is of 16 August 2011
|}

|}
| valign="top" |
 Head coach
 
 Assistant coach
 
 
 

Legend
 (C) Team captain
 Club field describes current pro club
|}

|}
| valign="top" |
 Head coach

 Assistant coaches

Legend
Age field is age on 16 August 2011
|}

|}
| valign="top" |
 Head coach

 Assistant coach(es)

Legend
(C) Team captain
Club field describes current pro club
nat field describes country of last club  before the tournament
Age field is age on 16 August 2011
|}

|}
| valign="top" |
 Head coach

 Assistant coaches

Legend
Club – describes lastclub before the tournament
Age – describes ageon 31 August 2011
|}

|}
| valign="top" |
 Head coach

 Assistant coaches

Legend
(C) Team captain
Club field describes current pro club
|}

Matches
The first ever international basketball game at the arena saw Australia thrash China. The Boomers without Patty Mills, Joe Ingles, Aleks Marić and Brad Newley who were all rested eased to a 28-point win. The second match saw Croatia beat rivals Serbia with Simon leading the line with 17 points. In the last game on day one, Great Britain played France. Joel Freeland topped scored for the hosts with 16 points while Tony Parker weighed in with 23 points for France. It was a scrappy match with 17 turnovers by halftime. Parker started well for France as he netted 10 points in the opening quarter. However, when he was rested in the second quarter the French team went for five minutes without scoring a basket. However, with Parker back France opened up a 12-point lead in the third quarter. Britain made mistakes in the final quarter as the French ranout winners by 22 points.

Serbia opened the second day with an 87–53 win over China. The second match saw France defeat Australia in a thriller. With Tony Parker the French had managed to establish a 13-point lead in third quarter. Parker scored a game high 27 points whilst Mills netted 20 for the Boomers. The final quarter witnessed Australia comeback at France and trailed by only one point with 11 seconds to go. However, Parker clinched the win for the French team. In the final match of the day world number 19 Croatia held on to beat Great Britain by five points. Strong opening and final quarters kept the hosts in the game. However, a poor second quarter saw Croatia into a 12-point lead at halftime. In the final quarter Britain started 14 points behind and climbed to within 3 points, before Lenzly and Simon sealed the win for Croatia.

Day three opened with a comfortable win for France over China, minus Tony Parker. Patty Mills led the Boomers with 20 points to defeat Croatia. Žorić top scored with 18 for Croatia who led by 5 at the end of the first quarter only to be 12 down at halftime, a gap that they never recovered from. In the final match of the day Serbia clinched victory over the hosts in the dying seconds. At halftime the teams could not be separated in 44 points each. Sullivan and Freeland hobbled off for the Brits whilst Boating top scored. Serbian captain, Nenad Krstić netted a game high 21 points as his team won with 2 seconds to spare. 

The opening match of day four saw France beat Croatia thanks to a 12-point blitz in 23 minutes from Parker. Luol Deng returned for Britain as they won their first match of the tournament defeating China. Deng who had been absent whilst running a camp for children netted 15 points for the hosts. However, he was out shone by Joel Freeland who was the MVP of the game netting 18 points. Yi netted a game high 20 points for China. Britain missing its captain Sullivan with injury managed to open a 6-point lead in the first half. However, China came within one point before Britain eased away to win their first match. In the final match of the day Australia took on Serbia. Australia turned a one-point deficit at the start of the final quarter into a nine-point win as they managed a 10-point swing. Ingles led the line for the Boomers with 17 points whilst Ogilvy snatched 10 rebounds.

On the final day Croatia beat injury deprived China, to finish in third place in the table. In the final match for Australia and Great Britain, it went to overtime as Deng top scored with 26 points. The Aussies led by four points at halftime and extended the lead to 10 in the third quarter. Britain battled back to force overtime, which they led until two free throws in the dying seconds saw the win go down under. The final match of the tournament saw France waste a 23-point lead but hang on to go undefeated throughout the week. France led by 17 points at halftime and with Serbia limiting time on court for their key men, France took advantage and went into a 23 with 4:12 left to play in the third quarter. Serbia then went route one with a 3-point barrage which saw them take the lead. France responded by sticking their starting five on to see out the match.

Standings and results

Reaction
Joanna Sutherland, London 2012 Competition Manager for Basketball was pleased with the volunteers saying that they had been enthusiastic and keen. Great Britain captain Drew Sullivan said that it was a shame that the venue was only temporary. While Patrick Mills said the atmosphere was good and the venue was nice. FIBA Secretary-General and International Olympic Committee (IOC) member Patrick Baumann, agreed with Sullivan about the venue being temporary, but he also said it was amazing what had happened in this part of London.

References

External links
Schedule
London International Basketball Invitational – London prepares series

2011–12 in British basketball
2011–12 in French basketball
2011–12 in Australian basketball
2011–12 in Serbian basketball
2011–12 in Croatian basketball
2011–12 in Chinese basketball
International basketball competitions hosted by the United Kingdom
Basketball
Basketball in London
2011 sports events in London